The women's freestyle 48 kilograms at the 2004 Summer Olympics as part of the wrestling program were held at the Ano Liosia Olympic Hall, in Athens, Greece from August 22 to August 23.

The competition is held with an elimination system of three or four wrestlers in each pool, with the winners qualify for the semifinals and final by way of direct elimination.

Schedule
All times are Eastern European Summer Time (UTC+03:00)

Results 
Legend
F — Won by fall

Elimination pools

Pool 1

Pool 2

Pool 3

Pool 4

Classification 5–8

Final round

Final standing

References
Official Report

Women's Freestyle 48 kg
Olym
Women's events at the 2004 Summer Olympics